Nicholas Craig Morris (born 7 June 1994) is an Australian speedway rider.

Career
Born in Canberra, Morris was successful as a youngster in youth racing in Australia before making the move into British racing in 2010 with Buxton Hitmen in the National League, the team going on to be crowned champions. It was the only season that Morris would race in the National League, making the step up to the Premier League and the Elite League in 2011. He won titles with Glasgow Tigers and Scunthorpe Scorpions in the Premier League, and with the Swindon Robins in the Elite League. Morris rode for Swindon Robins from 2012 to 2018. In 2017, he won the  |SGB Premiership Riders' Championship as a Swindon rider.

During the SGB Premiership 2018 while riding for Swindon he was the team captain under manager Alun Rossiter. He also rode for Lakeside Hammers in the SGB Championship 2018. The following season he rode for Wolverhampton and Somerset respectively.

In 2021 and 2022, he rode for the Wolverhampton Wolves in the SGB Premiership 2021 and SGB Premiership 2022 and for the Leicester Lions in the SGB Championship 2021 and SGB Championship 2022. In 2023, he stayed with Leicester as they moved up a division to the SGB Premiership 2023. This resulted in his time at Wolves coming to an end and his signing for Birmingham Brummies for the SGB Championship 2023.

World Final appearances

Under-21 World Cup
 2012 –  Gniezno, Stadion Start Gniezno S.A. – 2nd – 44pts (11)
 2015 –  Mildura, Olympic Park Speedway – 3rd – 29pts (12)

References

1994 births
Living people
Australian speedway riders
Birmingham Brummies riders
Buxton Hitmen riders
Glasgow Tigers riders
Coventry Bees riders
Lakeside Hammers riders
Leicester Lions riders
Scunthorpe Scorpions riders
Swindon Robins riders
Somerset Rebels riders
Wolverhampton Wolves riders